Foreshadow is a security vulnerability that affects modern microprocessors.

Foreshadow may also refer to:

 Foreshadow (film), a 2013 Australian film
 Foreshadow (LEXX), a fictional starship in the TV show LEXX

See also
 Foreshadowing (disambiguation)